The Stela of Pasenhor, also known as Stela of Harpeson in older literature, is an ancient Egyptian limestone stela dating back to the Year 37 of pharaoh Shoshenq V of the 22nd Dynasty (c.730 BCE). It was found in the Serapeum of Saqqara by Auguste Mariette and later moved to The Louvre, where it is still.

The stela was intended to commemorate the death of an Apis bull occurred in this year and its author, the Priest of Ptah and Prophet of Neith, Pasenhor (B), was the performer of the funerary rites. Despite the commemorative nature of the stela, Pasenhor took the opportunity to inscribe his own genealogy on it.

The first part of the stela reflects its original purpose:

This god (i.e. the Apis) was introduced to his father Ptah (i.e. was "enthroned"), in the Year 12, fourth month of the second season, fourth day, of King Aakheperre Shoshenq (V), given life. He was born in the year 11 of his majesty; he rested in his place in Tazoser (i.e. was buried in the cemetery) in the year 37, third month of the first season, day 27, of his majesty. May he grant life, prosperity, health, and joy of heart to his beloved son, the prophet of Neith, Pasenhor.

After that, Pasenhor begins to trace back along his genealogy for sixteen generations, until about the end of the 20th Dynasty:

Pasenhor's genealogy is quite important since he was a member of the royal family and could claim common ancestors with many pharaohs of the 22nd Dynasty. Thanks to the stela, we know more about the dynasty's origin and chronology, as well as the name of some otherwise unattested royal wives such as Karomama A, Tashedkhonsu and Kapes.

See also 

 Genealogy of Ankhefensekhmet

References

Bibliography
James Henry Breasted, Ancient Records of Egypt, volume IV: the Twentieh to the Twenty-sixth Dynasties, Chicago, The University of Chicago Press, 1906, § 785-792.
Kenneth Kitchen, The Third Intermediate Period in Egypt (1100–650 BC), 1996, Aris & Phillips Limited, Warminster, § 85ff.

P
P
Twenty-second Dynasty of Egypt
Egyptian antiquities of the Louvre
Pasenhor
Ptah